Milton Casper Elstner (1848–1912) was an American lawyer and former confederate soldier from Grant County, Kentucky. He served as United States Attorney for the Western District of Louisiana three separate times under five presidents.

Childhood
Milton was born to W. H. and Anna S. (Carter) Elstner, who were Kentucky natives. Milton and his parents came to Louisiana in 1859, locating in Caddo Parish. After living there a few years they moved to Arkansas, but in 1863, returned to Louisiana. In 1865 at the end of the American Civil War he joined one of the first Arkansas regiments (the Third), and was with Ben McCullough and McIntosh when they were killed at the battle of Elk Horn, which was a fight between Sigel and Earl Van Dorn. During his service he held the rank of major and quartermaster.

Law career
Milton received his collegiate education at the University of Kentucky in 1872 graduated from the law department of the same institution. He was first admitted to practice before the Supreme Court of Kentucky, and that year was admitted to the same in Shreveport, Louisiana, and in 1874 entered upon his practice. During the administration of President Arthur he filled the position of United States Attorney for the western district of Louisiana and in July, 1889, was re-appointed to the same office, and his duties have been performed in a manner highly flattering to himself ever since. He was an able lawyer, with a convincing and eloquent speech, and the reputation he gained was acquired largely through his own individual efforts and at the expense of diligent study and practical experience. In 1898, he once again was appointed to the position and he held it until 1910.

References

1848 births
1912 deaths
University of Kentucky alumni
19th-century American lawyers
Child soldiers in the American Civil War
Confederate States Army soldiers
People of Louisiana in the American Civil War
Louisiana lawyers
People from Grant County, Kentucky
People from Shreveport, Louisiana
People from Caddo Parish, Louisiana
United States Attorneys for the Western District of Louisiana